Uromodulin (UMOD), also known as Tamm–Horsfall protein (THP), is a Zona pellucida-like domain-containing glycoprotein that in humans is encoded by the UMOD gene. Uromodulin is the most abundant protein excreted in ordinary urine.

Gene 

The human UMOD gene is located on chromosome 16.  While several transcript variants may exist for this gene, the full-length natures of only two have been described to date. These two represent the major variants of this gene and encode the same isoform.

Protein 

THP is a GPI-anchored glycoprotein. It is not derived from blood plasma but is produced by the thick ascending limb of the loop of Henle of the mammalian kidney. While the monomeric molecule has a MW of approximately 85 kDa, it is physiologically present in urine in large aggregates of up to several million Da. When this protein is concentrated at low pH, it forms a gel. Uromodulin represents the most abundant protein in normal human urine (results based on MSMS determinations). It is the matrix of urinary casts derived from the secretion of renal tubular cells.

Structure 

Uromodulin consists of an EGF domain (EGF I); two calcium-binding EGF domains (EGF II, III); a cysteine-rich decoy module consisting of a β-hairpin and a D10C domain (previously referred to as D8C); a fourth EGF domain; and a C-terminal bipartite Zona pellucida-like (ZP) module consisting of ZP-N and ZP-C domains separated by an interdomain linker. The ZP domain polymerizes into filaments, with protruding arms that correspond to the EGF I-III domains and the decoy module.

Function 

Uromodulin excretion in urine follows proteolytic cleavage of the ectodomain of its glycophosphatidylinositol-anchored counterpart that is situated on the luminal cell surface of the loop of Henle. Uromodulin may act as a constitutive inhibitor of calcium crystallization in renal fluids. The excretion of uromodulin in urine may provide defense against urinary tract infections caused by uropathogenic bacteria.

The function of THP is not well understood. Studies using THP deficient mice revealed that THP may have a role in regulatory physiology and actually participates in transporter function. A role in bacterial binding and sequestration is suggested by studies showing that Escherichia coli which express MS (mannose-sensitive) pili or fimbriae (also fimbria, from the Latin word for "fringe") can be trapped by Tamm–Horsfall protein via its mannose-containing side chains. THP may also be important in protection from kidney injury by down-regulating inflammation.

Clinical significance 
Uropontin, nephrocalcin and uromodulin (this protein) are the three known urinary glycoproteins that affect the formation of calcium-containing kidney stones or calculus. Tamm–Horsfall protein is part of the matrix in renal calculi but a role in kidney stone formation remains debatable. However, decreased levels of Tamm–Horsfall in urine have been found to be a good indicator of kidney stones.

Defects in this gene are associated with the autosomal dominant renal disorders medullary cystic kidney disease-2 (MCKD2) and autosomal dominant tubulointerstitial kidney disease (ADTKD) (previously familial juvenile hyperuricemic nephropathy (FJHN)). These disorders are characterized by juvenile onset of hyperuricemia, gout, and progressive kidney failure.

Antibodies to Tamm–Horsfall protein have been seen in various forms of nephritis (e.g., Balkan nephropathy), however, it remains unclear whether there is any pathophysiologic relevance to these findings.

Another disease associated with mutations in this gene is Uromodulin-associated Kidney Disease (UKD), a rare autosomal dominant progressive failure of the kidneys.

In multiple myeloma, there is often protein cast in the distal convoluted tubule and collecting duct of the kidneys, mainly consisting of immunoglobulin light chain known as Bence Jones protein, but often also containing Tamm–Horsfall protein. This is known as myeloma cast nephropathy.

History 
The glycoprotein was first purified in 1952 by Igor Tamm and Frank Horsfall from the urine of healthy individuals. It was later detected in the urine of all mammals studied.

References

Further reading

External links 
  GeneReviews/NCBI/NIH/UW entry on UMOD-Related Kidney Disease Includes: Familial Juvenile Hyperuricemic Nephropathy, Medullary Cystic Kidney Disease 2
  OMIM entries on UMOD-Related Kidney Disease Includes: Familial Juvenile Hyperuricemic Nephropathy, Medullary Cystic Kidney Disease 2   
 Tamm–Horsfall protein deposition

Glycoproteins